Ulster Rugby is one of the four professional provincial rugby teams from the island of Ireland. They compete in the United Rugby Championship and the European Rugby Champions Cup.

The team represents the IRFU Ulster Branch, which is one of the four primary branches of the IRFU and is responsible for rugby union throughout the geographical Irish province of Ulster, comprising Northern Ireland (Antrim, Armagh, Down, Fermanagh, Londonderry and Tyrone) and three counties in the Republic of Ireland which are Donegal, Monaghan and Cavan.

History

Foundation (1868–1879)
A number of clubs were operating in Ulster prior to the foundation of the Irish Rugby Football Union and the Ulster branch. The Belfast-based North of Ireland F.C., founded in 1868, was the earliest club to operate in the province. Clubs from this era still in existence include Dungannon and Queen's University. The first Irish inter-provincial game took place in 1875 between Ulster and Leinster, with Ulster being the victors. In 's first international match, which was played in 1875 against , eight Ulster-based players took part. Rugby in Ulster at this time was mostly overseen by the Irish Football Union, with the Northern Football Union of Ireland controlling the game in Belfast. The two unions amalgamated in 1879, with the provincial branches of Ulster, Leinster and Munster being founded as part of the terms of this arrangement. The final Irish provincial side, Connacht, was founded in 1885.

Amateur era (1879–1995)
During the amateur era Irish players primarily played for their respective clubs, with provincial games effectively treated as Irish trial matches. The provincial teams were also used to provide competitive club opposition for touring international sides. Inter-provincial games were played on an irregular basis but starting in the 1946–47 season, the provinces played against each other in the annual Irish Interprovincial Championship. Ulster won this tournament 26 times in total, with eight of these titles being shared. The team's greatest period of success was in the 1980s and 1990s when they won ten titles in a row.

Professional success (1999–2006)
After rugby union was declared open to professionalism in 1995, the IRFU gradually developed the provincial sides as professional teams. The Heineken Cup was launched in 1995 to provide a new level of European cross-border competition, and Ulster, coached by Harry Williams and captained by David Humphreys, became the first Irish team to win it in the 1998–99 season, beating beat French side US Colomiers 21–6 in the final at Lansdowne Road in Dublin.

The Celtic League, featuring all four Irish provinces plus teams from Scotland and Wales, was launched in 2001. From 2001 to 2004, the Ulster team was coached by Alan Solomons, a former assistant coach of the Springboks and head coach of The Stormers and Western Province in his native South Africa. Solomons coached Ulster to a three-year unbeaten home record in the Heineken Cup. In the 2003–04 season, Ulster finished second in the Celtic League, only overtaken by Llanelli on the final day of the campaign. Two of Ulster's most impressive achievements in this period were a 33–0 win over English giants Leicester Tigers in the Heineken Cup in January 2004, and winning the inaugural Celtic Cup on 20 December 2003, beating Edinburgh in a rain-soaked Murrayfield final.

Solomons was succeeded by Mark McCall, former captain of the province and a member of Ulster's Heineken Cup winning squad, with former teammate Allen Clarke as his assistant, and Ulster's unbeaten home run in Europe was extended to four years. Dominant forward play by Australian lock Justin Harrison, New Zealand-born Irish scrum-half Isaac Boss, and a rapid maturing of a youthful home-grown three-quarter line made Ulster champions of the 2005–06 Celtic League. On the last day of the season, the title came down between Ulster and Leinster, before being decided in Ulster's favour by a 40-metre David Humphreys drop goal against Ospreys.

Decline (2006–2010)
Ulster started the 2006–07 season well, including beating Toulouse 30-3 in the Heineken Cup. But this form did not continue, they were eliminated from the competition early, and finished fifth in the Celtic League. Back row forward Roger Wilson was Player of the Year.

The team began the 2007-08 season with a poor run of results, and Mark McCall resigned in November following Ulster's embarrassing 32–14 home defeat to Gloucester in the opening round of the 2007–08 Heineken Cup. Assistant coach Steve Williams took temporary charge, and Matt Williams took charge in February, but failed to turn the season around, with Ulster finishing 9th in the 10 team Celtic League. Centre Darren Cave made his debut from the academy. At the end of the season wing Tommy Bowe, who was named Player of the Year, left for Ospreys. Roger Wilson went to Northampton Saints. Out-half David Humphreys retired, and was appointed the province's Director of Operations.

The following season out-half Ian Humphreys, David's younger brother, was signed from Leicester Tigers. Ulster finished third in their Heineken Cup group and eighth in the Celtic League, and Williams resigned. Hooker Rory Best was Player of the Year.

For the 2009-10 season a new management structure was put in place, with David Humphreys as director of rugby and Brian McLaughlin as head coach, assisted by Jeremy Davidson and Neil Doak. New signings included lock Dan Tuohy from Exeter. Centre Nevin Spence made his debut from the academy. The season saw an improvement in Ulster's Heineken Cup form, including their first away win in England against Bath, but they finished eighth in the Celtic League. Flanker Chris Henry was Player of the Year. At the end of the season, scrum-half Isaac Boss left for Leinster, and prop Justin Fitzpatrick retired.

Revival (2010–2014)
The 2010-11 season saw significant improvement. Ulster signed key players including 2007 Rugby World Cup winning Springboks Ruan Pienaar and Johann Muller. Out-half Paddy Jackson. and centre Luke Marshall made their debuts from the academy. Ulster made the semi-finals of the Celtic League and the quarter-finals of the Heineken Cup. Ruan Pienaar was Player of the Year.

New signings for the 2011-12 season included prop John Afoa and utility back Jared Payne. Academy lock Iain Henderson made his senior debut. Ulster reached the Heineken Cup final, losing to Leinster at Twickenham. The Celtic League had been renamed the Pro12 after the addition of two Italian teams, and Ulster finished sixth. Brian McLaughlin was replaced as head coach by Mark Anscombe. Flanker Chris Henry was Player of the Year.

New signings for the 2012–13 season included back row forward Nick Williams from the now defunct Aironi, wing Tommy Bowe, returning from his four-year stay at the Ospreys, back row forward Roger Wilson, returning from Northampton Saints, and Irish-qualified South African hooker Rob Herring, initially on a six month trial. Out-half Ian Humphreys left for London Irish. Centre Nevin Spence died in an accident at the family farm. Ulster started the season with 13 consecutive wins in all competitions, the longest unbeaten run in their history. They finished top of their group in the Heineken Cup, qualifying for the quarter-finals, where they lost to Northampton Saints. They finished top of the table in the Pro12, earning a home semi-final, in which they defeated Scarlets 27-16 in the last match before the old grandstand was demolished. The redevelopment of Ravenhill meant the final against Leinster had to be played at the RDS Arena in Dublin. Leinster won 24-18. Lock Alan O'Connor made his debut from the academy this season. Wing Andrew Trimble was Player of the Year.

The 2013–14 season proved trophyless again. For the first time, Ulster won all their Heineken Cup group games, with away victories against Montpellier and Leicester Tigers being the highlight. They were knocked out at the quarterfinal stage with a 17–15 home defeat to Saracens. The Pro12 season was racked with inconsistency and Ulster finished the league season in fourth place. This set up an away semi-final with Leinster, and for the fourth time in four seasons the season was ended by their old foes with a 13–9 defeat. Centre Stuart McCloskey and prop Andrew Warwick made their debuts from the academy. Andrew Trimble was Player of the Year for the second year running. The season ended with the retirements of captain Johann Muller, centre Paddy Wallace, and flanker Stephen Ferris. Director of Rugby David Humphreys also left the province to take up a similar position at Gloucester Rugby. Following Humphreys' departure, Mark Anscombe was sacked by the province and was replaced by Ireland defence coach Les Kiss on an interim basis.

2014–17 – the Les Kiss years
The 2014–15 season was Ulster's first under director of rugby Les Kiss and head coach Neil Doak. The redeveloped Ravenhill, renamed the Kingspan Stadium, now had a capacity of 18,196. Rory Best was named captain after the retirement of Johann Muller. New signings included out-half Ian Humphreys, returning from London Irish, lock Franco van der Merwe from the Lions, outside back Louis Ludik from Agen, and flanker Sean Reidy from Counties Manukau. Ulster were knocked out of the new European Champions Cup at the group stage. They finished fourth in the Pro12 but narrowly lost in the playoff semifinal to eventual champions Glasgow Warriors. Prop Declan Fitzpatrick retired at the end of the season. Wing Craig Gilroy was named Player of the Year.

In 2015–16, Ulster were knocked out of the Champions Cup at the group stage despite a memorable back to back win over Toulouse. They finished fourth in the Pro12 but reached the semi-finals, losing to Leinster. Wing Jacob Stockdale made his debut from the academy. Centre Stuart McCloskey was Player of the Year.

Before the 2016–17 season, Nick Williams left for Cardiff Blues and Dan Tuohy for Bristol Bears, and Ian Humphreys retired. Ulster signed back row forward Marcell Coetzee, fullback Charles Piutau and lock Kieran Treadwell. Academy flanker Nick Timoney made his debut. Ulster finished the season bottom of their pool in the Heineken Cup, and fifth in the Pro12. Charles Piutau was Player of the Year.

2017–18 - the "basket case" season
For the 2017–18 season, the Pro12 became the Pro14 with the addition of two South African teams. Head coach Neil Doak's contract was not renewed and he was replaced by Jono Gibbes. Assistant coach Allen Clarke also left, replaced by Dwayne Peel. All-time appearance holder Roger Wilson retired, and scrum-half Ruan Pienaar was blocked by the IRFU from extending his contract. John Cooney was signed from Connacht to replace him.

Before the season started, out-half Paddy Jackson and centre Stuart Olding were charged with rape and suspended from playing pending trial. Both would be acquitted, but have their contracts revoked. Australian out-half Christian Lealiifano was signed on loan. Prop Tom O'Toole made his debut from the academy. After a poor run of form over the Christmas period, Les Kiss resigned as Director of Rugby, and Gibbes cut his contract short, leaving at the end of the season. Ulster finished third in their Champions Cup pool, and fourth in Conference B of the Pro14, failing to qualify for the playoffs and needing to win a playoff to qualify for the next season's Champions Cup. Former Ireland captain Brian O'Driscoll described the province as "a bit of a basket case", facing "Administration issues, senior players retiring, the well documented court case, now no number 10 to build the team around, no coach next year, struggling for Champions Cup rugby next season." Scrum-half John Cooney was named Player of the Year.

2018–present – rebuilding under Dan McFarland
For the 2018–19 season Dan McFarland was brought in as the new head coach. Jared Payne, Tommy Bowe, Andrew Trimble and Chris Henry all retired, and Charles Piutau left for Bristol Bears. Out-half Billy Burns was signed from Gloucester, prop Marty Moore from Wasps, flanker Jordi Murphy from Leinster, and utility back Will Addison from Sale Sharks. Prop Eric O'Sullivan, wing Robert Baloucoune, centre James Hume, fullback Michael Lowry and flanker Marcus Rea all made their debuts from the academy.  Ulster finished the season as quarter-finalists in the Champions Cup, and semi-finalists in the Pro14, losing to Glasgow Warriors. Rory Best and Darren Cave retired at the end of the season. Centre Stuart McCloskey was Player of the Year for the second time.

Lock Iain Henderson was named captain for the 2019–20 season. Ulster were again quarter-finalists in the Champions Cup, going out to Toulouse, and reached the final of the Pro14, losing to Leinster. Centre Stewart Moore and wing Ethan McIlroy made their debuts from the academy, and scrum-half John Cooney was Player of the Year for the second time.

The 2020–21 season was shortened by the Covid-19 pandemic, and games were played behind closed doors. Ulster finished second in Conference A of the Pro14, but failed to make the knockout stages of the Champions Cup and were entered into the Challenge Cup. They progressed to the semi-finals, where they were beaten by Leicester Tigers. The season's final competition was the Pro14 Rainbow Cup, pitting the Pro14's European teams against the four South African teams who were leaving Super Rugby. Ulster's form in this competition was poor, and they finished tenth in the European pool. Marcell Coetzee cut short his contract and left for the Bulls before the end of the season. Academy players Cormac Izuchukwu, Nathan Doak, David McCann, Callum Reid and Aaron Sexton all made their senior debuts this season. Lock Alan O'Connor was Player of the Year.

In 2021–22 the Pro14 became the United Rugby Championship, with the addition of four new South African teams. Ulster made the semi-finals, where they narrowly lost to the Stormers in Cape Town. In the Champions Cup, they made the knockout stage, but went out in a two-legged round of sixteen playoff against Toulouse by an aggregate score of 50-49. Centre James Hume was Player of the Year.

Previous season summaries

Gold background denotes championsSilver background denotes runner-up

* After dropping into the competition from the Champions Cup/Heineken Cup

Current standings

United Rugby Championship

European Rugby Champions Cup
Pool B

Honours
European Rugby Champions Cup
Winners: 1 (1998–99)
Runners Up: 1 (2011–12)
PRO14
Winners: 1 (2005–06)
Runners Up: 3 (2003-04, 2012-13, 2019-20)
United Rugby Championship Irish Shield
Runners Up: 1 (2021-22)
Celtic Cup
Winners: 1 (2003–04)
Irish Inter-Provincial Championships
Winners: 26 (8 shared) (1946–47, 1950–51, 1951–52, 1953–54, 1955–56 (shared), 1956–57 (shared), 1966–67 (shared), 1967–68, 1969–70, 1970–71, 1972–73, 1974–75, 1975–76 (shared), 1976–77, 1977–78 (shared), 1982–83 (shared), 1984–85, 1985–86, 1986–87, 1987–88 (shared), 1988–89, 1989–90, 1990–91, 1991–92, 1992–93, 1993–94 (shared)
Glasgow City Sevens
Winners: 1 (2013–14)

Crest

The current crest was introduced in 2003. The new, stylised crest is made specific to Ulster Rugby as it incorporates the red hand from the provincial flag of Ulster with two rugby balls. The Ulster Rugby crest is on all official club merchandise including replica jerseys.

Stadium

The Ravenhill Stadium, known for sponsorship reasons as the Kingspan Stadium since 2014, opened in 1923. It has hosted two Rugby World Cup matches, several Ireland national team matches, the 2015 Pro12 Grand Final and many 2017 Women's Rugby World Cup matches, including the final.

The Premium Stand opened in 2009. In 2011, the Northern Ireland Executive announced that it had granted £138m for various stadium redevelopment projects throughout Northern Ireland. Ulster Rugby received £14.5m, which was used to redevelop Ravenhill and expand its capacity from 12,000 to 18,000. The rest of the redevelopment took place from 2012 to 2014. In 2012, Ulster Rugby confirmed that three new stands would be built at Ravenhill, with work commencing in late 2012. Two new stands at the Memorial and Aquinas ends of the stadium were completed while the main stand was demolished and rebuilt. The major refurbishment was completed in April 2014. After the rest of the redevelopment was completed, the stadium was renamed the Kingspan Stadium.

Home Attendance

Up to date as of the 2021–22 season.

Current squad

Academy squad

Staff

Results versus representative sides
Scores and results list Ulster's points tally first.

Records against URC and European Cup opponents

Updated as of 04 March 2023.

Head coaches (professional era)

Personnel honours and records
Bold indicates active player

All Competitions

(correct as of 04 March 2023)

European Rugby Champions Cup

(correct as of 21 January 2023)

United Rugby Championship

(correct as of 28 January 2022)

Team of the Year

Pro14 Player of the Year

Pro14 Individual Awards

Pro14 Team Awards
2012–13 Pro12 Fair Play Award
2013–14 Pro12 Fair Play Award (joint)
2015–16 Pro12 Fair Play Award

British & Irish Lions
The following Ulster players, in addition to representing Ireland,  have also represented the British & Irish Lions.

 Bold indicates player was tour captain for the year in question

Note: Phillip Matthews played for the Lions in their victory against France in Paris. The game formed part of the celebrations of the bi-centennial of the French Revolution, but did not count as a "formal" Lions international.

Ulster Rugby Awards

See also

 United Rugby Championship
 European Rugby Champions Cup
 History of rugby union matches between Leinster and Ulster
 History of rugby union matches between Munster and Ulster
 History of rugby union matches between Connacht and Ulster

Notes

References

External links
 Official site
 The UAFC – Ulster Rugby Supporters site
 The UAFC – Ulster Supporters Forum 
 Videos of Ulster Matches
 InTouch Rugby Ulster Rugby Online News
 The FRU Ulster Supporters Fanzine

 ercrugby Profile 

 
Rugby clubs established in 1879
Rugby union in Ulster
Rugby union governing bodies in Ireland
Rugby
Heineken Cup champions
United Rugby Championship teams
1879 establishments in Ireland